Andre Agassi was the defending champion and successfully defended his title, by defeating Petr Korda 6–3, 6–4 in the final.

Seeds
The first eight seeds received a bye to the second round.

Draw

Finals

Top half

Section 1

Section 2

Bottom half

Section 3

Section 4

References

External links
 Official results archive (ATP)
 Official results archive (ITF)

Sovran Bank Classic Singles